Aubusson (Occitan auvergnat: Le Buçon, formerly Aubuçon) is a commune in the Creuse department region in central France.

Geography
Aubusson is situated in the southern part of the département, at the confluence of the rivers Creuse and Beauze.  The route nationale N141 goes through the town.

History
Local lore previously held that the community was settled by defeated Berbers following the 8th-century Battle of Tours, but it is now established that Aubusson has existed at least since the Gallo-Roman period. The Camp des Châtres, within the town's boundaries, for a long time considered a Roman fort, actually dates back a little further, to the Iron Age.

The town was known as Albuciensis in 936 and under the name  Albuconis in 1070. The name possibly originates from a name of a man, Albucius  Other scholars claim the name is from a Celtic word meaning  craggy. In the Middle Ages the town was ruled by viscounts. The vicecomital family also produced a troubadour named Joan d'Aubusson.

Tapestry

Aubusson is well known for its tapestry and carpets, which have been famous throughout the world since the 14th century. Its origins were born with the arrival of weavers from Flanders, who took refuge in Aubusson around 1580. There is a famous collection of Aubusson tapestries at Vallon-Pont-d'Arc. The style of the tapestries produced has changed through the centuries, from scenes of green landscapes through to hunting scenes. In the 17th Century, the Aubusson and Felletin workshops were given "Royal Appointment" status. A downturn in fortunes came after the French revolution and the arrival of wallpaper. However, tapestry made something of a comeback during the 1930s, with artists such as Cocteau, Dufy, Dali, Braque, Calder and Picasso being invited to Aubusson to express themselves through the medium of wool. Aubusson tapestry still thrives today, preserving a range of traditional skills. In 1983, l’Atelier Raymond Picaud chose Burhan Doğançay's Ribbon Series as a tapestry subject. Coventry cathedral's famous Christ in Glory tapestry, designed by artist Graham Sutherland, was woven in nearby Felletin. Installed in 1962, this was the world's largest vertical tapestry up until the 1990s.

Population

Sights

Musée Départemental de la Tapisserie
Created in 1981, the museum exhibits nearly 600 years of tapestry creation and production. This rich collection is composed of 17th, 18th and 19th Century tapestries and carpets. As well as works from its own collection, there are also regular exhibitions of tapestries from around the world, showcasing works right up to the present day.

Centre Culturel Jean Lurcat, Avenue des Lissiers

Maison du Tapissier
This is a permanent exhibition that is staged in an ancient Creusois house in Aubusson. The interior tells the history and traditions of tapestry as well as showing furniture of the period.

Historical buildings
 The Clock Tower
 The old town (ancient buildings)
 Sainte-Croix church
 Ruins of the chateau (also called le Chapitre)
 The Vallenet House

Rulers
In the medieval period, Aubusson was a vicomté (fr) which is similar to the English vice-county. Its rulers were:
Ranulf I  ?-934
Robert I 934-942
Renaud I 942-958 (son of Ranulf I)
Ranulf II Cabridel 958-1031
Ranulf III 1031-1060
Renaud III 1060-1069
William I 1069-1106
Renaud IV  1106-?
Renaud V The Leper  ?-1185
Guy I 1185- ?
Renaud VI  ?-1249
Ranulf V  1249-c. 1265
William II (heir) 1263, lord of La Borne, La Feuillade, Monteil-au-Vicomte, Poux, Pintarion and Damoiseau (1317), started a noble line that continued with his son Renaud VIII (1317–1353) and his successors.

Around 1263/1266 the vice-county was sold to the count of La Marche.

Notable people 
 Jules Sandeau (1811–1883), member of the Académie française
 André Jorrand (1921–2007), composer and organist

International relations
Aubusson is twinned with:
 Eguisheim, France
 Assen, Netherlands

See also
 Communes of the Creuse département

References

External links

Communes of Creuse
Subprefectures in France
County of La Marche